In enzymology, a S-alkylcysteine lyase is an enzyme that catalyzes the chemical reaction

an S-alkyl-L-cysteine + water  an alkyl thiol + ammonia + pyruvate

Thus, the two substrates of this enzyme are S-alkyl-L-cysteine and water, whereas its three products are alkyl thiol, ammonia, and pyruvate.

This enzyme belongs to the family of lyases, specifically the class of carbon-sulfur lyases.  The systematic name of this enzyme class is S-alkyl-L-cysteine alkyl-thiol-lyase (deaminating; pyruvate-forming). Other names in common use include S-alkylcysteinase, alkylcysteine lyase, S-alkyl-L-cysteine sulfoxide lyase, S-alkyl-L-cysteine lyase, S-alkyl-L-cysteinase, alkyl cysteine lyase, and S-alkyl-L-cysteine alkylthiol-lyase (deaminating).  It employs one cofactor, pyridoxal phosphate.

References

 

EC 4.4.1
Pyridoxal phosphate enzymes
Enzymes of unknown structure